Zackary Patrick Kuntz (born June 6, 1999) is an American football tight end. He played college football at Penn State and Old Dominion.

Early life and high school
Kuntz was born on June 6, 1999, in Camp Hill, Pennsylvania. He attended Camp Hill High School, where he was a member of their basketball, football, and track & field teams. He had 49 receptions for 793 yards and 11 touchdowns during his sophomore season. As a senior, Kuntz caught 40 passes for 1,060 yards and nine touchdowns. He also won the Pennsylvania Class AA Championship in the 110-meter hurdles as a junior. Kuntz was rated a four-star recruit and committed to play college football at Penn State over offers from Alabama, Michigan, and Ohio State.

College career
Kuntz enrolled early and joined the Penn State Nittany Lions in January 2018. He played in one game and caught one pass for eight yards before redshirting his true freshman season. Kuntz played in all 13 of Penn State's games, primarily on special teams, and had two receptions for 18 yards on offense. 

After his redshirt sophomore season, Kuntz transferred to Old Dominion. In his first season with the Monarchs, he caught 73 passes for 692 yards and five touchdowns and was named first-team All-Conference USA.

References

External links
Old Dominion Monarchs bio
Penn State Nittany Lions bio

Living people
American football tight ends
Penn State Nittany Lions football players
Old Dominion Monarchs football players
Players of American football from Pennsylvania
1999 births